Wimanicrustidae is an extinct family of graptolites.

Genera
List of genera from Maletz (2014):

†Bulmanicrusta Kozłowski, 1962
†Ellesicrusta Kozłowski, 1962
†Graptoblastoides Kozłowski, 1949
†Graptoblastus Kozłowski, 1949
†Holmicrusta Kozłowski, 1962
†Hormograptus Öpik, 1930
†Lapworthicrusta Kozłowski, 1962
†Maenniligraptus Mierzejewski, 1986b
†Ruedemannicrusta Kozłowski, 1962
†Thallograptus Öpik, 1928
†Urbanekicrusta Mierzejewski, 1986b
†Wimanicrusta Kozłowski, 1962
†Xenocyathus Eisenack, 1982

References

Graptolites
Prehistoric hemichordate families